Arlín Segundo Ayoví Ayoví (born 6 May 1979) is a retired Ecuadorian footballer.

Honors
LDU Quito
Serie A: 2007

External links
 
 FEF Player Card

1979 births
Living people
Ecuadorian footballers
Association football defenders
Barcelona S.C. footballers
C.D. Olmedo footballers
L.D.U. Quito footballers
C.D. Cuenca footballers
C.S.D. Independiente del Valle footballers
C.D. Técnico Universitario footballers
Manta F.C. footballers